Romain Arneodo and Tristan-Samuel Weissborn were the defending champions but chose not to defend their title.

Robert Galloway and Nathaniel Lammons won the title after defeating Javier Barranco Cosano and Raúl Brancaccio 4–6, 7–6(7–4), [10–8] in the final.

Seeds

Draw

References
 Main draw

Challenger La Manche - Doubles
2019 Doubles